Coastal California, also known as the California Coastline and the Golden Coast, refers to the coastal regions of the U.S. state of California. The term is not primarily geographical as it also describes an area distinguished by cultural, economic and political attributes.

Geography

The area includes the North Coast, San Francisco Bay Area, Central Coast, and South Coast. The coastline is slowly eroding due to natural processes and potentially accelerated by climate change, though much more slowly in other places in the United States. In the last 100 years, the water line has risen less than  along the coast of California.

Climate
Point Conception tends to divide the Coastal region by mid-summer into warmer (south and east) and cooler zones (north). Peak and often intense heat tends to arrive in September much later than the rest of the nation or state. Over time, droughts and wildfires have increased in frequency and become less seasonal and more year-round, further straining the region's water security.

Counties

The counties commonly seen as constituting coastal California are:

South Coast
Los Angeles
Orange
San Diego

Central Coast
Monterey
San Benito
San Luis Obispo
Santa Barbara
Santa Cruz
Ventura

San Francisco Bay Area
Alameda
Contra Costa
Marin
Napa
San Francisco
San Mateo
Santa Clara
Solano
Sonoma

North Coast
Del Norte
Humboldt
Mendocino

Demographics
During the 2000 Census, roughly a third of households had incomes exceeding $75,000, compared to 17.6% in the Central Valley and 22.5% at the national average. While the area has always been relatively expensive, when compared to inland regions and the national average, the recent real estate boom has left it as the most expensive housing market in the nation. An October 2004 CNN Money publication found that a  home in a "middle management neighborhood" would cost an average of $1.8 million.

See also
California Coast Ranges
California Coastal Records Project low altitude photographs of the entire coast
California State Route 1
California's congressional districts
Greater Los Angeles Area
Left Coast

References

External links 

Geology of the California Coast by geologist Andrew Alden

Regions of California
California